Nicholas Montgomery may refer to:

Nicholas Montgomery (died c.1424), MP for Derbyshire (UK Parliament constituency) in 1388, 1390 and 1411
Nicholas Montgomery (died 1435), MP for Derbyshire (UK Parliament constituency) in 1414 and 1416
 Nick Montgomery (born 1981), English-born Scottish footballer